2017 Special Photo Edition is the first special extended play from South Korean boy band UP10TION. It was released on October 12, 2017, by TOP Media. The album consists of three tracks, including the title track, "Going Crazy".

Music video and commercial performance
The music video of "Going Crazy" was released on October 12, 2017 as of 2021 the video garned over 2 million views.

The EP sold 22,392+ copies in South Korea. It peaked at number 9 on the Korean Gaon Chart.

Track listing

References 

2017 EPs
Korean-language EPs
Kakao M EPs
Up10tion EPs